The 1976 Idaho Vandals football team represented the University of Idaho in the 1976 NCAA Division I football season. The Vandals were led by third-year head coach Ed Troxel and were members of the Big Sky Conference, then in Division II. They played their home games at the Kibbie Dome, an indoor facility on campus in Moscow, Idaho.

Season

The season opened with a road win over Boise State, the three-time defending conference champions, in the debut of Jim Criner as head coach of the Broncos. Originally scheduled for November 27, it was moved to the opener at BSU's request, so as not to interfere with the Division II  In the Battle of the Palouse, the Vandals suffered a ninth straight loss to neighbor Washington State of the Pac-8, falling  at Martin Stadium in Pullman on October 2. The Cougars were led by quarterback Jack Thompson and fullback Dan Doornink.

Notable players
Center John Yarno of Spokane was selected to the AP All-American team, which included a prime-time appearance on Bob Hope's Christmas show on NBC on Monday, December 13. The All-America team was headlined by Heisman Trophy winner Tony Dorsett of Pittsburgh. Yarno was also selected to play in the East–West Shrine Game and the  His number 56 was retired the following year. Selected in the fourth round of the 1977 NFL Draft, he played six seasons with the Seattle Seahawks, the last five as a starter.

Future actor Bill Fagerbakke of Rupert was a sophomore defensive lineman and was ticketed to redshirt, but was called into action in the fourth game. Head coach Troxel planned on moving him to the offensive line in 1977, but a knee injury in spring drills ended Fagerbakke's athletic career, which turned his focus to theater.

Division I
Through 1977, the Big Sky was a Division II conference for football, except for Division I member Idaho, which moved down to I-AA in 1978. Idaho maintained its upper division status in the NCAA by playing Division I non-conference opponents (and was ineligible for the Division II postseason).

Schedule

Roster

All-conference
Senior center John Yarno was the Big Sky offensive player of the year and one of six Vandals selected to the all-conference team.  three on offense were running back Robert Brooks, guard Clarence Hough, and tackle  The two defensive players were linebacker Kjel Kiilsgaard and end Chris Tormey, a future Vandal head coach   Second team selections were tackle Greg Kittrell, noseguard Tim Sanford, and linebacker

NFL Draft
One Vandal was selected in the 1977 NFL Draft, which lasted twelve rounds (335 selections).

List of Idaho Vandals in the NFL Draft

References

External links
Gem of the Mountains: 1977 University of Idaho yearbook – 1976 football season
Idaho Argonaut – student newspaper – 1976 editions

Idaho
Idaho Vandals football seasons
Idaho Vandals football